I Love to Dance is the debut album by New York City based band Kleeer, released in 1979.

Track listing
"Tonight's The Night (Good Time)" (Norman Durham)  6:20 	
"Keeep Your Body Workin'" (Norman Durham)  5:19 
"Happy Me" (Norman Durham)  4:30	 	
"I Love To Dance" (Norman Durham)  4:28 	
"It's Magic" (Richard Lee, Jr.)  7:19 	
"To Groove You" (Paul Crutchfield, Woody Cunningham)  3:14	
"Amour" (Paul Crutchfield)  5:08 	
"Kleeer Sailin'" (Woody Cunningham)  5:47

Personnel
 Norman Durham - bass, vocals, synthesizer, Syn drums, percussion, guitar, Clavinet, piano
Woody Cunningham - drums, vocals, Syn drums, percussion
Richard Cummings - Fender Rhodes electric piano, Clavinet
Paul Crutchfield - percussion, vocals, wind chimes, congas
Richard Lee - guitar, vocals, percussion
Terry Dolphin - vibraphone, grand piano
Angel Nater Jr. - percussion
Gene Orloff - concertmaster
Marvin Stamm, Randy Brecker - trumpet, flugelhorn
Isabelle Coles - lead vocals, backing vocals
Louise Fischer - foreign language vocals

Charts

Singles

References

External links
 Kleeer-I Love To Dance at Discogs

1979 debut albums
Kleeer albums
Atlantic Records albums